Devynduoniai (formerly) is a village in Kėdainiai district municipality, in Kaunas County, in central Lithuania. According to the 2011 census, the village has a population of 161 people. It is located 7 km from Gudžiūnai, by the Liaudė river.

History
Devynduoniai village is known since 1593. During Soviet era it was a subsidiary settlement of "Žemaitė" kolkhoz.

Demography

References

Villages in Kaunas County
Kėdainiai District Municipality